John Chalmers Crawford (11 October 1902 – 1973) was a Scottish footballer who played as a goalkeeper. After starting off at Alloa Athletic, his most prominent spell was at Blackburn Rovers, where he won the FA Cup in 1928. He took part in what proved to be the last Home Scots v Anglo-Scots international trial match in the same year, but this did not lead to a full cap for Scotland. He had to retire due to injury a short time after returning north on loan with East Stirlingshire.

References

Scottish footballers
Footballers from Stirling
1902 births
1973 deaths
Date of death missing
Association football goalkeepers
Scottish Football League players
Scottish Junior Football Association players
English Football League players
FA Cup Final players
Stenhousemuir F.C. players
East Stirlingshire F.C. players
Blackburn Rovers F.C. players
Alloa Athletic F.C. players